Meyer Levy (May 16, 1887 – January 26, 1967 in Manhattan, New York City) was an American lawyer and Democratic politician from New York.

Life
He was a member of the New York State Assembly (New York Co., 26th D.) in 1916 and 1917.

He was a member of the New York State Senate (17th D.) in 1923 and 1924; and was Chairman of the Committee on General Laws.

He died on January 26, 1967, in Park East Hospital at East 83rd Street in Manhattan.

Sources
 LEVY'S PLURALITY 2,229 in NYT on December 7, 1922
 BRONX BAR HEADS ELECTED in NYT on January 10, 1935 (subscription required)
 MEYER LEVY DIES, EX-STATE SENATOR in NYT on January 27, 1967 (subscription required)

1887 births
1967 deaths
Democratic Party New York (state) state senators
People from Manhattan
Democratic Party members of the New York State Assembly
20th-century American politicians